Sulitsa is a village in Stara Zagora Municipality, Stara Zagora Province, Bulgaria.

Geography
Sulitsa is located below Stara Planina and Sredna Gora. It is situated in a shallow valley, as it is surrounded on almost all sides by high hills. On road, Sulitsa is 18 kilometers from Stara Zagora, the nearest city.

References

Villages in Stara Zagora Province